Raymond Crawford (born 13 July 1936) is an English former international footballer, who played as a striker in a career that saw him score over 300 goals at club level.

Career

Club
Crawford began his career as a trainee at his home town club Portsmouth. He made his league debut on 24 August 1957 in a goalless draw with Burnley. He managed 19 appearances for the club at senior level before joining second flight Ipswich Town in August 1958.
 
A prolific striker, he helped Ipswich to win back-to-back titles, the Second Division in 1960-61 and the First Division in 1961-62. In the latter season, he was joint leading scorer in Division One – alongside Derek Kevan of West Bromwich Albion – with 33 goals. During this time, he won the first of his two England caps, becoming the first Ipswich Town player to be capped for England.

He was sold to Wolves in September 1963 where he scored 41 goals in 61 appearances (in total), before moving to rivals West Brom in January 1965, shortly before Wolves dropped out of the top flight. He failed to establish himself though at The Hawthorns and rejoined Ipswich in March 1965, where he played another three full seasons, lifting his tally for the club to 259 goals in all competitions.

He joined Charlton in March 1969, but soon dropped into the non-league with Kettering Town. He signed for Colchester United in June 1970 for £3,000 and in his only season with the club, scored 24 goals from 45 appearances. Most notably, he scored two goals for Colchester United in a giant-killing 3–2 victory against Leeds United in the fifth round of the FA Cup in 1971.

Crawford left English football after this season, heading to Durban City in South Africa, leaving an exceptional scoring rate in the Football League of 289 goals in 476 games. In his only season in South Africa, he won the cup and finished runner-up in the league.

He became youth-team coach at Brighton in 1972 but left after Brian Clough became manager the following year. He then worked as youth team Manager and assistant Manager to Jimmy Dickinson at his former side Portsmouth until 1979 and later managed non-league Fareham Town and Winchester City for a short while before retiring from the game in 1984, and becoming a merchandising representative. He is now retired but still plays a big active role within the community of Portsmouth, appearing at a lot of charity events and is a popular figure at Fratton Park every home game.

In 2007, he published his autobiography entitled "Curse of the Jungle Boy".
The book explain how Crawford was known to all as ‘Jungle Boy’ because of his army service in Malaya. He had his own Jungle Boy chant used a lot by the fans.

Crawford now works as a summariser on Express FM commentaries on Portsmouth matches and occasionally on Radio Suffolk on Ipswich Town games. He is known for his loud cheers and shouts and became an instant hit on Express FM. The former frontman also provides a weekly column for the Yellow Advertiser online newspaper discussing the fortunes of Colchester United FC.

International
Crawford's international career was surprisingly brief, but had three caps with two different countries. He made his international debut with Malaya national football team in 1956. He played at left-wing for Malaya in their 4-2 win over Singapore on 1st April 1956 in the annual Sportsman's Trophy match. He was also named among the 17 players which travelled to represent Malaya in the Asian Cup qualifiers away in Cambodia and South Vietnam in April-May 1956, and not in the starting XI in either of the two qualifiers (Govindarajoo was the starting left-wing). After that, he played for England national football team against Northern Ireland on 22 November 1961 and played in their next fixture, versus Austria on 4 April 1962, where he opened the scoring in a 3–1 win.

He also played for the Football League representative team.

Honours
Ipswich Town

First Division/Premier League: 
1961–62

Second Division/Championship: 
1960–61, 1967–68

Individual
Football League Second Division top scorer: 1960–61

Football League First Division top scorer: 1961–62

Ipswich Town Hall of Fame: Inducted 2007

Colchester United Player of the Year: 1970–71

Colchester United Hall of Fame

Records
Ipswich Town F.C. all-time top scorer: 218 goals.

The first footballer to score hat-tricks in the Football League, League Cup, FA Cup and European Cup.

Notes

References

External links
Heroes who shaped the history of the Cup – Guardian report

1936 births
Living people
Footballers from Portsmouth
English footballers
England international footballers
Malaysia international footballers
British expatriates in Malaysia
Association football forwards
English Football League players
First Division/Premier League top scorers
Portsmouth F.C. players
Ipswich Town F.C. players
Wolverhampton Wanderers F.C. players
West Bromwich Albion F.C. players
Charlton Athletic F.C. players
Kettering Town F.C. players
Colchester United F.C. players
Fareham Town F.C. managers
English Football League representative players
English autobiographers
Durban City F.C. players
English football managers
Dual internationalists (football)